The wildlife of Kenya refers to its fauna. The diversity of Kenya's wildlife has garnered international fame, especially for its populations of large mammals. Mammal species include lion (Panthera leo), cheetah (Acinonyx jubatus) hippopotamus (Hippopotamus amphibius), African buffalo (Syncerus caffer), wildebeest (Connochaetes), African bush elephant (Loxodonta africana), zebra (Equus), giraffe (Giraffa), and rhinoceros. Kenya has a very diverse population of birds, including flamingo and common ostrich (Struthio camelus).

Fauna

Mammals

Large plains herbivores 
 Common eland The largest of the antelope in the savannah, lives in most national parks and reserves.

 WildebeestShare grazing with zebra and stay in groups, lives in places like Nairobi National Park and Amboseli National Park. It also visits Masaai Mara National Reserve in great numbers during the spring as part of the annual Great Migration.

 African buffalo Also known as the African buffalo are known to be the most dangerous animal in Africa. They can be found in most national parks and reserves.

 Black rhinoceros and white rhinocerosMost black and white species are being relocated to safe places because of their endangerment, but there are still many wild rhino roaming Kenya. Although there are few places for visitors to see them, you are sure to find black rhinos at Nairobi National Park, Tsavo National Park, Masaai Mara and Aberdares National Park. Both species abundant in Lake Nakuru National Park and Lewa Downs.

 Elephant Found in many different habitats in Kenya. They can be found from the hot coastlands to the cool moorlands of the Aberdares and Mount Kenya range. A few of these places are Aberdares National Park, Meru National Park, Samburu National Reserve, Maasai Mara, Tsavo National Park and Amboseli National Park.

 Giraffe Have little competition for the tender leaves of the acacia tree, their principal food.

Aquatic herbivores 
 Hippopotamus Irritable and normally cranky, are very dangerous. They are found in many of Kenya's basins, swamps, and areas with water. Some other places to find them are Nairobi National Park, Meru National Park, and Kora National Park.

Medium-sized herbivores 
 Impala A medium-sized antelope often found in large herds, and known for its leaping ability.

 Common warthog A type of wild pig.

 Waterbuck A medium-sized antelope often found near sources of water, are known for excreting a scent that makes them unappetizing to most predators. Two subspecies, the Common and Defassa waterbuck are present in Kenya.

 Lesser Kudu The smaller relative of the significantly larger Greater Kudu, the Lesser Kudu is often a rare sight but common throughout the drier parts of the country.

Small herbivores 
 Suni A small antelope similar to the oribi and duiker. They travel in groups of two or alone. They can be found in different areas in Kenya.

 Oribi They travel alone or in groups of two or three. They are similar to the suni and the duiker.

 Duiker Normally travel alone but sometimes go in pairs. They are similar to the suni and oribi.

 Thomson's gazelle and Grant's gazelle A common sight across the plains of Kenya, they are often found in small or large herds and are the favored prey of the cheetah. Two species, the more common Thomson's gazelle and the larger Grant's gazelle live across the country.

Predators 
 Lion A powerful predator who uses its power to its advantage. It can be found all over Kenya, and in places such as Nairobi National Park, Mount Kenya National Park, and Kora National Park.
 Leopard Another predator which, like the lion, uses brute force. They hunt at night and use their eyesight to spot and kill their prey. They can be found at Nairobi National Park, Mount Kenya National Park, Meru National Park, Kora National Park and over almost all of Kenya.
 Cheetah A big cat that lives in places like Nairobi National Park, Meru National Park and Kora National Park.
 African wild dog A predator that roams over parts of Kenya in packs. The African Wild Dog Conservancy is actively engaged in helping to save this endangered species from extinction.
 Spotted hyena A powerful predator that sometimes travels in groups. They have the strongest jaw pressure and most powerful bite out of any animal in Kenya except for the Nile crocodile. Both the spotted and striped variety of hyena can be found at Nairobi National Park, Mount Kenya National Park, and Kora National Park.
 Serval One of the small wild cat species in Kenya.
 Genet A small viverrid that lives in Kenya.
 Black-backed jackal A small dog-like predator that travels in small groups across Kenya.

Birds

Reptiles
 Nile crocodile A large, powerful reptile that has been known to attack and kill people. It inhabits many areas of Kenya.

National Parks 

 Nairobi National Park
 Mount Kenya National Park
 Meru National Park
 Kora National Park
 Sibiloi National Park
 Amboseli National Park
 Tsavo East National Park 
 Tsavo West National Park 
 Lake Nakuru National Park
 Hell's Gate National Park
 Chyulu Hills National Park
 Marsabit National Park
 Ol Donyo Sabuk National Park
 Aberdare National Park
 Saiwa Swamp National Park

Reserves 

 Maasai Mara
 Samburu National Reserve
 Buffalo Springs National Reserve
 Shaba National Reserve
 Shimba Hills National Reserve
 Kisumu Impala Sanctuary
 Lewa Downs ← a conservancy

See also
Elephant hunting in Kenya

References

External links 
 Kenya Wildlife Service, a state corporation
 Wild Dog Conservancy, a nonprofit

Tourism in Kenya
Kenya
Biota of Kenya